Eversince (alternatively stylized 3V3R51NC3) is the debut studio album by Swedish rapper and Drain Gang member Bladee. It was released on May 25, 2016 by YEAR0001. The album contains elements of hip hop, R&B, gothic rock, new wave music, and electronic music.

Eversince was released on vinyl on May 26, 2022.

Track listing

References 

2016 debut albums
Bladee albums
Year0001 albums